The 2022 Men's Oceania Handball Challenge Trophy was held at Rarotonga, Cook Islands between 5 and 9 December 2022.

This is the seventh ever championship. The competition participants were defending champions Australia, the hosts Cook Islands, New Zealand, hosts New Caledonia and Tonga.

Australia won their fifth title in the round robin event. Hosts New Caledonia were third followed by New Zealand, the Cook Islands and Tonga. The Under-18 competition was won by Tahiti.

Australia now qualify for the 2023 Men's Junior World Handball Championship in Germany and the 2023 IHF Inter-Continental Trophy

Results

Rankings

References

Oceania Men's Handball Challenge Trophy
Handball